Greenmead Historical Park, also known as Greenmead Farms, is a  historic park located at 38125 Base Line Rd., Livonia, Michigan.  It includes the 1841 Greek Revival Simmons House, six other structures contributing to the historic nature of the property, and additional buildings moved from other locations.  Greenmead Farms was designated a Michigan State Historic Site in 1971 and listed on the National Register of Historic Places in 1972.

History

In 1825, twenty-three-year-old Joshua Simmons, along with his wife Hannah, moved from Bristol, New York to a  parcel of land in what is now Livonia.  Simmons named his farm "Meadow Brook," and built a small log cabin on the property in 1826.  In 1841, he hired Sergium Lyon to build the Greek Revival farmhouse that still stands on the property.  Simmons continued to farm, adding buildings as needed and acquiring additional property to become the wealthiest landholder in Livonia by the time of his death in 1882.

The Simmons family stayed on the farm until 1915.  In 1920, the farm was purchased by Sherwin and Jean Boyd Hill, who renamed it "Greenmead."  Hill raised dairy cattle at the farm until his death in 1961.  The farm was placed on the National Register of Historic Places in 1972, and the city of Livonia purchased in 1976 for use as a park, and moved other historic structures, including a number of pre-Civil War houses, onto the grounds.  As of 2010, the property is open to the public.

Description of the original farm complex
The 1841 farmhouse is a two-story, Greek Revival frame house with side gables and clapboard siding, sitting on a stone foundation.  Drip molding surmounts the windows, and Ionic pilasters flank the front door.  The interior has five fireplaces, and period 19th-century woodwork.

In addition to the house, nine of the original eleven outbuildings are still standing.  These include the 1829 North Barn (the first barn built in Livonia), the farmhand's house (believed to be the original Simmons cabin), an additional barn and a greenhouse.

Other structures moved to Greenmead
Four additional structures built in the mid-19th century, collectively known as "the village," are located on the Greenmead grounds:

The eastern part of the park features seven more historic buildings, restored to the appearance they had in the 1915-1920 timeframe.  This cluster of buildings mimics the actual intersection of Ann Arbor Trail and Newburgh Roads in Livonia.  The seven buildings are:

References

External links

Greenmead Historical Park - official site from the city of Livonia

Protected areas of Wayne County, Michigan
Museums in Wayne County, Michigan
Open-air museums in Michigan
Historic house museums in Michigan
Farm museums in Michigan
Houses on the National Register of Historic Places in Michigan
Houses completed in 1841
Michigan State Historic Sites
Houses in Wayne County, Michigan
National Register of Historic Places in Wayne County, Michigan